"That's Hilarious" is a song recorded and produced by American singer Charlie Puth. It was released through Atlantic Records as the second single from his third studio album, Charlie, on April 8, 2022. Puth wrote the song with Jacob Kasher. Before the release of this emotionally-charged power ballad single, a tear-filled Charlie Puth warned his audience that the song was the toughest song for him to write, record, and release, as it chronicled some of the darkest moments of his life going through a difficult breakup. A acclaimed review from billboard says "He might finally have the last laugh with this one".

Charts

Weekly charts

Monthly charts

Year-end charts

References

 

 
2022 singles
2022 songs
Atlantic Records singles
Charlie Puth songs
Songs written by Charlie Puth
Song recordings produced by Charlie Puth